The Ontario Federation of Agriculture (OFA) is a general farm organization established in 1936 as the Ontario Chamber of Agriculture and headquartered in Guelph, Ontario. It was founded by the United Farmers of Ontario, the United Farmers’ Co-operative Company Ltd., and various growers and other agricultural organizations as a non-partisan lobbying and marketing organization for farmers. In 1940, it changed its name to the  Ontario Federation of Agriculture. In 1943, the United Farmers of Ontario dissolved and its remnants were absorbed by the OFA.

The OFA comprises 52 county farm organizations from across the province. Bette Jean Crews was acclaimed OFA President at the 2008 Annual General Meeting, held in Toronto, Ontario, in November. Crews took over for Geri Kamenz, who had served in that capacity for the previous two years.

See also
United Farmers of Ontario

References

External links 
 Official site

1936 establishments in Ontario
Agricultural organizations based in Canada
Politics of Ontario
Organizations established in 1936
Farmers' organizations